Suphisellus neglectus is a species of burrowing water beetle in the subfamily Noterinae. It was described by Young in 1979 and is found in Belize, Colombia, Guatemala, Mexico and Panama.

References

Suphisellus
Beetles described in 1979